Hurricane Fran, also referred initially as Subtropical Storm Bravo, was a long-tracked Category 1 hurricane that caused little damage during its existence in early October 1973. Originating from a tropical wave that developed off the coast of Hispaniola on October 1, the precursor to Fran slowly developing during the first week of October. By October 4, a surface low formed within the system and convective activity increased. The system was eventually classified as a subtropical depression on October 8 and was upgraded to Subtropical Storm Bravo shortly thereafter. Bravo became increasingly tropical throughout the day as it intensified. Following a reconnaissance mission into the storm on October 10, it was deemed fully tropical and upgraded to a hurricane, at which time it was renamed Fran.

Hurricane Fran rapidly tracked towards the northeast in response to an area of low pressure within the westerlies. Situated over exceedingly cold waters, Fran transitioned into an extratropical cyclone late on October 12 as it neared the French coastline. Shortly before reaching land, the system was absorbed by a cold front. Throughout its existence, Fran had little effect on land.

Meteorological history

Hurricane Fran originated from a tropical wave associated with an area of convection north of Hispaniola on October 1. The system tracked westward at  but gained little strength and the National Hurricane Center (NHC) did not anticipate development of the storm. By October 4, the system interacted with a mid-tropospheric trough near the southeast United States, resulting in the formation of a surface low. Tracking eastward, showers and thunderstorms began to develop around the circulation; however, the structure of the system was not fully tropical. On October 7, ships in the vicinity of the low reported decreasing barometric pressures, indicating a strengthening system. Satellites monitoring the system depicted a disorganized storm with mainly subtropical characteristics. Late on October 8, the cyclone had become sufficiently organized to be classified a subtropical depression.

Cold air from the remnants of a cold front became entrained within the circulation; however, the cold air gradually warmed. On October 9, winds increased to gale-force and the depression was upgraded to a subtropical storm, at which time it was given the name Bravo. Following this finding, the National Hurricane Center reclassified the system as a tropical system and renamed it Fran, dropping its previous designation of Bravo. Upon becoming tropical, Fran developed a strong outflow and several convective feeder bands.

Steered generally eastward by a deep surface low in the westerlies, Fran accelerated towards the Azores Islands. The storm traveled at a rapid pace of  but continued to organize. By October 11, the hurricane began to undergo an extratropical transition as it continued to move unusually fast towards the northeast. Later that day, the central pressure of Fran decreased to 978 mbar (hPa), the lowest recorded in relation to the hurricane. Shortly after reaching this intensity, the hurricane transitioned into an extratropical cyclone and quickly merged with a cold front off the coast of France.

Preparations and impact
Although Fran passed near the Azores as a hurricane, winds on the islands only reached  and no damage was recorded.

See also

List of Azores hurricanes
Other storms named Fran
Hurricane Otto (2010)

References

External links
The National Hurricane Center's Preliminary Report on Hurricane Fran
Monthly Weather Review

1973 Atlantic hurricane season
Category 1 Atlantic hurricanes
Hurricanes in the Azores